Saidy Janko (born 22 October 1995) is a professional footballer who plays for Bundesliga club VfL Bochum, on loan from Real Valladolid. Although Janko primarily recognised as a right-back, he is equally capable of playing on the right wing. Born in Switzerland, he played international football for Switzerland up to under-21 level before switching to play for the Gambia national team at senior level.
 
Janko began his career with FC Zürich before signing for Manchester United in 2013. After a loan spell with Bolton Wanderers, Janko moved to Scottish club Celtic in 2015. He had a loan to Barnsley before moving to Saint-Étienne permanently in July 2017.

Club career

Manchester United
Janko began his career at FC Zürich. He joined Manchester United on summer transfer deadline day in 2013. He was one of only three signings made by David Moyes during the 2013 summer transfer window. In his first season, he was voted the Reserve Player of the Year. On 26 August 2014, he made his first-team debut in a League Cup match against Milton Keynes Dons, playing the first half before being substituted for fellow debutant Andreas Pereira as United lost 4–0.

On 2 February 2015, transfer deadline day, Janko joined Championship club Bolton Wanderers on loan for the rest of the season, with Andy Kellett going in the opposite direction for the same period. He made his debut for the club on 10 February, starting in a 3–1 league win over Fulham at the Macron Stadium. He crossed to assist Eiður Guðjohnsen's equaliser before half time, before scoring himself in the 80th minute from 25 yards out.

Celtic
On 1 July 2015, Celtic announced that they had signed Janko on a four-year contract. He made his debut nine days later, coming on as a substitute for Gary Mackay-Steven 75 minutes into Celtic's 1–0 win over Real Sociedad in a pre-season friendly at St. Mirren Park. Janko made his competitive debut on 1 August, coming on as a second-half substitute during Celtic's 2–0 win over Ross County in the opening league match of the Scottish Premiership season.

On 31 August 2016, Janko joined Championship club Barnsley on a one-year loan deal. He scored on his debut in a 4–0 away win against Wolverhampton Wanderers on 13 September.

Saint-Étienne
On 7 July 2017, Janko left Celtic for French Ligue 1 club Saint-Étienne, signing a four-year contract.

Porto
Janko moved to Portuguese club FC Porto on a five-year contract on 17 June 2018. He returned to the EFL Championship on 31 August that year, joining Nottingham Forest on loan for the 2018–19 season.

On 1 July 2019, Janko entered football in his native country for the first time in his career, being loaned to Young Boys for the Swiss Super League season. He scored his first goal on 14 September in the second round of the Swiss Cup, in an 11–2 win at fifth-tier FC Freienbach. In total Saidy played 46 official matches, starting 38 of them, as they won the double (Super League and Cup).

Real Valladolid
On 1 October 2020, Real Valladolid signed Janko on a four-year contract to end in 2024, for an undisclosed fee. He made his debut in La Liga 24 days later in a 2–0 home loss to Deportivo Alavés.

On 27 June 2022, VfL Bochum announced the signing of Janko on a season-long loan, with an option to buy at the end of the spell.

International career
Janko was born in Zürich to a Gambian father and an Italian mother. He was a youth international for Switzerland from 2012 to 2015, before opting to represent the Gambia in 2021. He made his debut for the Gambia national team in a 2–0 friendly loss to Sierra Leone on 9 October 2021.

He played in the 2021 Africa Cup of Nations, his national team's first continental tournament, where they reached the quarter-finals.

Personal life
He is the brother of fellow professional footballer Lenny Janko.

Career statistics

Club

International

Honours
Celtic
 Scottish Premiership: 2015–16, 2016–17
 Scottish Cup: 2016–17

Young Boys
 Swiss Super League: 2019–20
 Swiss Cup: 2019–20

Individual
 Denzil Haroun Reserve Player of the Year: 2013–14

References

External links

1995 births
Living people
Gambian people of Italian descent
Swiss people of Gambian descent
Swiss people of Italian descent
Footballers from Zürich
Gambian footballers
Swiss men's footballers
Association football defenders
Association football midfielders
The Gambia international footballers
Switzerland youth international footballers
2021 Africa Cup of Nations players
English Football League players
Scottish Professional Football League players
Ligue 1 players
Championnat National 3 players
Swiss Super League players
La Liga players
Segunda División players
FC Zürich players
Manchester United F.C. players
Bolton Wanderers F.C. players
Celtic F.C. players
Barnsley F.C. players
AS Saint-Étienne players
FC Porto players
Nottingham Forest F.C. players
BSC Young Boys players
Real Valladolid players
VfL Bochum players
Gambian expatriate footballers
Swiss expatriate footballers
Swiss expatriate sportspeople in England
Expatriate footballers in England
Swiss expatriate sportspeople in Scotland
Expatriate footballers in Scotland
Swiss expatriate sportspeople in France
Expatriate footballers in France
Swiss expatriate sportspeople in Portugal
Expatriate footballers in Portugal
Gambian expatriate sportspeople in Spain
Swiss expatriate sportspeople in Spain
Expatriate footballers in Spain
Swiss expatriate sportspeople in Germany
Expatriate footballers in Germany